Etmadpur  Assembly constituency is one of the 403 constituencies of the Uttar Pradesh Legislative Assembly, India. It is a part of the Agra district  and one of the five assembly constituencies in the Agra Lok Sabha constituency. First election in this assembly constituency was held in 1957 after the "DPACO (1956)" (delimitation order) was passed in 1956. After the "Delimitation of Parliamentary and Assembly Constituencies Order" was passed in 2008, the constituency was assigned identification number 86.

Wards  / Areas 
Extent  of Etmadpur Assembly constituency is Etmadpur Tehsil; Ward Nos. 12, 17, 19,  28, 59, 61 & 73 in Agra (M Corp.) of Agra Tehsil.

Members of the Legislative Assembly

Election results

2022

2017

2012

See also

Agra district
Agra Lok Sabha constituency
Sixteenth Legislative Assembly of Uttar Pradesh
Uttar Pradesh Legislative Assembly

References

External links
 

Politics of Agra district
Assembly constituencies of Uttar Pradesh
Constituencies established in 1956